Paul Eidelberg (born 1928) is an American-Israeli political scientist, author and lecturer, and is the founder and president of The Foundation for Constitutional Democracy, with offices in Jerusalem.  He is also president of the Yamin Yisrael Party.

Early career
Eidelberg served in the United States Air Force where he held the rank of first lieutenant.  He received his doctoral degree at the University of Chicago where he studied under Leo Strauss. He designed the electronic equipment for the first brain scanner at the Argonne Cancer Research Hospital.

Academic career
Before immigrating to Israel in 1976, Eidelberg wrote a trilogy on America’s founding fathers: The Philosophy of the American Constitution, On the Silence of the Declaration of Independence, and a Discourse on Statesmanship.

In 1976 he joined the faculty of Bar-Ilan University, and holds adjunct positions at Otago University in New Zealand and The University of Georgia.

He has written several books on the Arab-Israel conflict and on Judaism. Demophrenia analyses the mentality of Israel’s ruling elites.  Jewish Statesmanship: Lest Israel Fall, which has been translated into Hebrew and Russian, discusses what he sees as the flaws inherent in Israel’s system of governance and how they may be remedied.  His work, A Jewish Philosophy of History, investigates the world-historical events leading to the rebirth of Israel in 1948.

Policy and politics
In addition to writing more than 1,000 articles for newspapers and scholarly journals in the U.S. and Israel, he is a weekly guest on The Tamar Yonah Show on Arutz Sheva radio.

In 2003, Eidelberg's Yamin Yisrael ran with Herut – The National Movement for the Knesset elections of that year. The joint list fell 8,000 votes short of the electoral threshold. After the elections Herut and Yamin Yisrael parted ways.

In 2005, Yamin Yisrael merged with the Jewish National Front. Eidelberg stood number seven on the JNF's list for the Israeli Knesset for the 2006 election. The party did not pass Israel's electoral threshold. Yamin Yisrael and the JNF have since parted ways due to political and ideological differences.

Eidelberg has a weekly column in the Jewish Press, a leading American Orthodox Jewish newspaper.

Published works
Eidelberg has published numerous papers and articles.  Some of his published books include:

The fixation of Israel's elites on "land for peace" : five interpretations, Shaare Tikvah : Ariel Center for Policy Research, 2007.   
On the silence of the Declaration of independence, Amherst : University of Massachusetts Press, 1976.  
Our culture 'left' or 'right' : litterateurs confront nihilism (with Will Morrisey), E. Mellen Press, 1992, Lewiston, N.Y., 1992. 
''Jewish statesmanship : lest Israel fall, University Press of America, Lanham, Md. 2002  
A Jewish philosophy of history : Israel's degradation and redemption Lightcatcher Books, 2007 Springdale, Ark. 
A discourse on statesmanship; the design and transformation of the American polity. University of Illinois Press, Urbana, 1974 
Judaic man : toward a reconstruction of Western civilization, Caslon Co., Middletown, NJ, 1996. 
Jerusalem vs. Athens : in quest of a general theory of existence University Press of America, Lanham, Md. 1983 
Beyond the secular mind : a Jewish response to the problems of modernity Greenwood Press, New York, 1989

See also
 Eidelberg

External links 
 The Foundation for Constitutional Democracy
 Articles by Paul Eidelberg

Living people
Israeli political scientists
Leaders of political parties in Israel
Israeli people of American-Jewish descent
Yamin Yisrael politicians
Jewish National Front politicians
1928 births